Tomáš Enge (born 11 September 1976) is a Czech former professional racing driver who has competed in many classes of motorsport, including three races in Formula One.

Career

Born in Liberec, Enge started his career at the age of 16, entering a Ford Fiesta he bought with his own money in the Czechoslovakian Ford Fiesta Cup. 

Enge participated in the final three races of the  Formula One season, becoming the first, and to date only, driver from the Czech Republic to compete in Formula One. He made his debut at the Italian Grand Prix on 16 September, after being brought in by Prost as a replacement for Luciano Burti, who was recovering from his crash at the previous race in Belgium. The Prost team folded before the start of the 2002 season, leaving Enge without a drive.

He obtained his Formula One break using the sponsorship from the local Coca-Cola subsidiary, which had also funded the Nordic Racing F3000 team he raced for that year. He finished third in the 2001 standings despite missing the final race, and was stripped of the 2002 title due to a positive marijuana test. He returned to Formula 3000 in 2004, and then headed to America for 2005, driving for Panther Racing in the IRL, with modest success, although almost winning the race at Sonoma. Among his 17 career IRL starts was his rookie start in the 2005 Indianapolis 500. He then drove for Team Czech Republic in the 2005-2006 A1GP season. Enge has also been a frequent driver for Prodrive's sportscar teams, driving both their Ferrari 550 Maranellos and Aston Martin DBR9s in the 24 Hours of Le Mans. In 2006 he was driver of the #007 Aston Martin Racing entry in the American Le Mans Series, but for 2007 will switch to the Petersen/White Lightning Ferrari F430.

On 31 March 2007, Enge was injured whilst driving his F430 at the ALMS St. Petersburg race. The car crashed whilst leading the GT2 class, suffering heavy damage to the driver's side and a brief fire. Enge was removed under medical supervision and transported to the local medical centre. He was later revealed to have suffered a shattered elbow, cracked ribs, a partially collapsed lung and a potentially broken ankle, but not to be in any serious danger.

On 21 July 2007, Enge was released from his contract with Peterson Motorsports/White Lightning Racing due to a penalty incurred after crashing into Mika Salo during the Acura Sports Car Challenge ALMS race at the Mid-Ohio Sports Car Course.

In 2009 he drove for Aston Martin Racing in the Le Mans Series and won the championship alongside Stefan Mücke and Jan Charouz. He remained with Aston Martin, as he moved into the FIA GT1 World Championship for the 2010 season, joining Darren Turner at Young Driver AMR. The pairing finished fourth in the championship with three victories. Enge and Turner were split for the 2011 season; Turner was joined by Stefan Mücke, while Enge was partnered by Alex Müller. Enge and Müller achieved two victories as they finished fourth in the championship.

With Young Driver AMR pulling out of the championship to focus on other series, Enge moved to the Reiter Engineering Lamborghini squad for the 2012 season, where he partnered socialite Albert von Thurn und Taxis. The pairing were lying tenth in the championship after four rounds; their best result was a second-place finish at the Slovakia Ring. On 19 June 2012, it was announced that Enge had tested positive for a banned substance at the Navarra round of the championship, and was suspended from racing. At the beginning of August, it was announced that Enge was to be suspended from racing for 18 months. Enge is appealing the decision on the grounds that the positive test was caused by medication he is taking for a chronic cardiovascular condition.

Racing record

Complete International Formula 3000 results
(key) (Races in bold indicate pole position) (Races in italics indicate fastest lap)

Complete Formula One results
(key) (Races in bold indicate pole position)

Complete American Le Mans Series results

Complete European Le Mans Series results

Rolex Series career
(key) (Races in bold indicate pole position)

24 Hours of Le Mans results

American Open-Wheel
(key)

IndyCar Series

Complete A1 Grand Prix results
(key) (Races in bold indicate pole position) (Races in italics indicate fastest lap)

Complete FIA GT Championship results

Complete GT1 World Championship results

Complete Blancpain Sprint Series results

Dakar Rally results

See also
24 Hours of Le Mans 2002, 2003, 2004, 2005, 2006
List of sportspeople sanctioned for doping offences

References

External links

 
 
 Biography of Tomáš Enge

1976 births
Living people
Sportspeople from Liberec
Czech sportspeople in doping cases
Czech racing drivers
Doping cases in auto racing
Czech Formula One drivers
IndyCar Series drivers
Indianapolis 500 drivers
A1 Team Czech Republic drivers
Rolex Sports Car Series drivers
Prost Formula One drivers
German Formula Three Championship drivers
American Le Mans Series drivers
International Formula 3000 drivers
24 Hours of Le Mans drivers
24 Hours of Daytona drivers
European Le Mans Series drivers
FIA GT1 World Championship drivers
Blancpain Endurance Series drivers
ADAC GT Masters drivers
International GT Open drivers
24 Hours of Spa drivers
Asian Le Mans Series drivers
Dakar Rally drivers
Arden International drivers
A1 Grand Prix drivers
Aston Martin Racing drivers
Starworks Motorsport drivers
G-Drive Racing drivers
Charouz Racing System drivers
FIA GT Championship drivers
Panther Racing drivers
Cheever Racing drivers
Opel Team BSR drivers
West Competition drivers
Ma-con Motorsport drivers
Nordic Racing drivers
Larbre Compétition drivers
ISR Racing drivers
Nürburgring 24 Hours drivers
24H Series drivers